PBA on KBS was branding used by KBS Sports for the television and radio presentation of Philippine Basketball Association (PBA) games for the 1975 and 1977 seasons. It aired on Kanlaon Broadcasting System (now Radio Philippines Network).

History
The PBA signed a contract with Kanlaon Broadcasting System (KBS) to cover its 1975 season games for over a million pesos. In 1976, the games were covered by Banahaw Broadcasting Corporation. The coverage moved back to KBS for the 1977 season.

Broadcasting teams

1975
 Play-by-play Frank Sanchez and Raffy Mejia; Color Caloy Prieto

1977
Play-by-play - Frank Sanchez, Raffy Mejia and Dick Ildenfonso
Color - Caloy Prieto and Emy Arcilla
Courtside Reporter/interviewer - Willie Hernandez

See also
Philippine Basketball Association
PBA on Solar TV - PBA coverer using the same Channel 9 frequency.

|-

KBS
Radio Philippines Network original programming
1970s Philippine television series
1975 Philippine television series debuts
1975 Philippine television series endings
1977 Philippine television series debuts
1977 Philippine television series endings
Philippine sports television series

ceb:PBA on KBS